Stanley Alan Plotkin (born May 12, 1932) is an American physician who works as a consultant to vaccine manufacturers, such as Sanofi Pasteur, as well as biotechnology firms, non-profits and governments. In the 1960s, he played a pivotal role in discovery of a vaccine against rubella virus while working at Wistar Institute in Philadelphia. Plotkin was a member of Wistar’s active research faculty from 1960 to 1991. Today, in addition to his emeritus appointment at Wistar, he is emeritus professor of Pediatrics at the University of Pennsylvania.  His book, Vaccines, is the standard reference on the subject. He is an editor with Clinical and Vaccine Immunology, which is published by the American Society for Microbiology in Washington, D.C.

Early life and education
Plotkin was born and raised in New York City, the son of Jewish parents, Lee and Joseph Plotkin, who emigrated from England. He attended The Bronx High School of Science in New York City. While attending Bronx Science, at the age of 15, he read a pair of books that greatly influenced his future education and career choices: Arrowsmith by Sinclair Lewis and Microbe Hunters by Paul de Kruif. Deciding to dedicate his life to being a physician and research scientist, Plotkin graduated from Bronx Science in 1948. He then earned his bachelor's degree from New York University in 1952 and went on to earn his MD at SUNY Downstate Medical Center in 1956. Plotkin received his GME from the School of Medicine, University of Pennsylvania in 1963.

Career

The Wistar Institute of Anatomy and Biology
During his time at Wistar, Plotkin worked on several vaccines; chief among them are vaccines for rubella, rabies, rotavirus, and cytomegalovirus (CMV). He developed a vaccine for rubella, based upon the RA 27/3 strain of the virus (also developed by Plotkin using WI-38, a fetal-derived human cell line), which was released to the public in 1969. The enabling technology was the WI-38 cell strain gifted to Plotkin by Leonard Hayflick also of the Wistar. WI-38 provide the key elements for the successful Rubella vaccine. The virus became attenuated when grown on WI-38; it was free of unwanted viruses and the vaccine proved to have minor side effects when compared with the HPV vaccine developed at the NIH. This WI-38 grown vaccine led to the eradication of the disease in the United States, according to the Centers for Disease Control and Prevention, in 2005. Plotkin, working with Tadeusz Wiktor and Hilary Koprowski, produced a human vaccine for rabies during the 1960s and 1970s also on the WI-38 cell strain gifted to them by Leonard Hayflick. WI-38 provided to the rabies vaccine the same properties that it gave to the rubella vaccine. This rabies vaccine can be used as a preventive measure for people who have an increased risk of contracting rabies, as well as a treatment for those who have been exposed recently to the disease, preventing infection in nearly 100 percent of cases. Another vaccine that Plotkin co-developed, working with H. Fred Clark and Paul Offit, is for rotavirus. In 2006, the team's vaccine became part of the U.S. recommended vaccine schedule for babies. In the 1970s, Plotkin led the development of an experimental vaccine against CMV. This vaccine, developed using attenuated CMV, has yet to make it into commercial production.

Other positions held
 1956: Internship, Cleveland Metropolitan General Hospital
 1957: Officer, Epidemic Intelligence Service, United States Public Health Service
 1959–1973: Instructor, then associate professor, School of Medicine, University of Pennsylvania

 1961: Resident, Children's Hospital of Philadelphia
 1962–1963: Resident, Hospital for Sick Children London
 1964: Joseph P. Kennedy Jr. Foundation scholar
 1965–1972: Associate physician, Children's Hospital of Philadelphia
 1972–1990: Director of infectious diseases and senior physician, Children's Hospital of Philadelphia
 1974–1991: Professor of pediatrics and microbiology, School of Medicine, University of Pennsylvania
 1974–1991: Professor of virology, Wistar Institute
 1984–1986: President, medical staff, Children's Hospital of Philadelphia
 1991–1998: Medical and scientific director Pasteur Merieux Connaught, Marnes-la-Coquette
 2003: Professor emeritus, Wistar Institute
 2006: Professor emeritus of virology, University of Pennsylvania
 2006: Executive advisor, Sanofi Pasteur
 2014: Senior advisor, Global Virus Network
 Associate chairman, department of pediatrics, University of Pennsylvania
 Member, Center for HIV/AIDS Vaccine Immunology
 Adjunct professor, Johns Hopkins Bloomberg School of Public Health
 Scientific advisor, Mymetics
 2017: Scientific advisor (and co-founder) of the Coalition for Epidemic Preparedness Innovations (CEPI)

Awards
 1987: James D. Bruce Memorial Award, American College of Physicians
 1993: Distinguished Physician Award, Pediatric Infectious Disease Society
 1995: Ed Nowakowski Senior Memorial Clinical Virology Award, Pan American Society for Clinical Virology
 1998: Chevalier of the French Legion of Honor Medal
 2002: Albert B. Sabin Gold Medal
 2005: Election to the Institute of Medicine of the National Academies
 2007: Distinguished Graduate Award, Perelman School of Medicine at the University of Pennsylvania
 2009; Maurice Hilleman/Merck Laureate, American Society of Microbiology
 2009: Maxwell Finland Award for Scientific Achievement
 2013: Caspar Wistar Medal of Achievement
 2013-2014: Hamdan Award for Medical Research Excellence
 2014: Dr. Charles Mérieux Award for Achievement in Vaccinology and Immunology

Personal life
Plotkin and his wife, Susan, have two children, Michael and Alec. In 1957, Plotkin wanted to join the US Air Force so that he could learn to fly, but instead he went to work for the Epidemic Intelligence Service. He eventually realized his dream of learning to fly at the age of 74.

Selected publications

References

External links 
 https://hillemanfilm.com/stanley-plotkin  Short film- Stanley Plotkin: Pioneering the use of fetal cells to make rubella vaccine

American pediatricians
Vaccinologists
1932 births
Living people
University of Pennsylvania faculty
American medical researchers
American virologists
20th-century American educators
The Bronx High School of Science alumni
American immunologists
Members of the National Academy of Medicine